Ben Is Back is a 2018 American drama film written and directed by Peter Hedges, and starring Julia Roberts, Lucas Hedges and Courtney B. Vance. The plot follows a mother who tries to help her addict son after he returns home from rehab.

The film had its world premiere at the Toronto International Film Festival on September 8, 2018, and was theatrically released on December 7, 2018, by LD Entertainment, Roadside Attractions, and Lionsgate. The film received generally favorable reviews from critics, who praised the performances of Hedges and Roberts, but grossed just $12 million against its $13 million budget.

Plot
Holly Burns returns from church on Christmas Eve to find her son Ben in the driveway; he has been in rehab for prescription drug addiction for some months, and says his sponsor said a trip home would be good for him. Happy to see him but Holly is also wary, as she does not want his instability to affect the other children. She agrees lets him stay for 24 hours only if he does not leave her sight.

While holiday shopping at the mall, Holly runs into Ben's former doctor, now an old man with dementia. She scolds him for getting her son hooked on painkillers after a snowboarding accident when Ben was younger. Ben sees his childhood friend, Spencer, also a drug addict. He tells Holly he needs to go to a support group meeting, where he later shares the story of how he almost overdosed, but was saved by his mom and the family dog, Ponce.

Holly finds drugs on Ben and he claims a girl at the meeting gave them to him. Furious, she takes him to the cemetery, asking him where he would like to be buried. That evening, the family returns home from church to find that someone has broken into their home and taken Ponce.

Realizing it is to do with him, Ben leaves the house to find him. Holly follows in her car, finding Ben in a nearby neighborhood. He blames himself for someone attempting to hurt his family. They search for Ponce together to no avail.

While eating at a diner, Ben tells Holly that he got a local girl, Maggie, hooked on drugs and is responsible for her death. Spencer shows up and, after a tussle, he confirms that Clayton, a drug dealer he used to work for, took Ponce. Ben demands Holly goes home, but she refuses.

Telling her she does not know the real "him," Ben reveals that his sponsor told him not to return home and that he did not get the drugs Holly found from a girl at the support group but rather hidden in the attic above his younger siblings' bedroom. Leaving Holly stranded at a gas station, he goes to meet Clayton. Ben tries to buy his dog back, but Clayton says Ben must do a drug run for him.

Meanwhile, Holly goes to Maggie's mom for help, who gives her a med kit for reviving a person who has suffered an overdose and her car keys to go find Ben. She tracks down Spencer, giving him drugs she had confiscated from Ben earlier, in exchange for him telling her where he might be.

Ben completes the mission and gets Ponce back, but Clayton also gives him some drugs in return. Driving out to an abandoned barn, he parks on the side of the road. He leaves Ponce in the car with a note asking whoever finds it to call his mom.

After looking for Ben all night, Holly is overwrought and goes to a police station. While there, she receives a call from a man who found Ponce, driving out to retrieve him. Holly follows Ponce to the barn where she finds Ben unconscious, having taken the drugs from Clayton. Holly uses the kit and desperately tries to revive him, while sobbing for him to "come back" to her. After a few minutes, Ben takes a breath.

Cast
 Julia Roberts as Holly Burns, Ben and Ivy's mother and Neal's wife
 Lucas Hedges as Ben Burns, Holly's son, Ivy's brother and Neal's stepson
 Courtney B. Vance as Neal Beeby, Ben and Ivy's stepfather and Holly's 2nd husband
 Kathryn Newton as Ivy Burns, Ben's sister, Holly's daughter and Neal's stepdaughter
 Rachel Bay Jones as Beth Conyers, the mother of Ben's deceased ex-girlfriend, Maggie
 David Zaldivar as Spencer "Spider" Webbs, a drug addict and one of Ben's old friends
 Alexandra Park as Cara K at AA meeting, a Ben drug customer
 Michael Esper as Clayton, Ben's local drug supplier and Ponce thief
 Tim Guinee as Phil, AA meeting member
 Henry Stram as Mr. Richman, Ben's high school history teacher who gave Ben oxycontin in exchange for sexual favors
 Myra Lucretia Taylor as Sally, a homeless woman
 Kristin Griffith as Mrs. Crane, wife of Alzheimer doctor male
 Jack Davidson as Dr. Crane, husband of Alzheimer female
 Mia Fowler as Lacey Burns-Beeby, Holly and Neal's 10-year-old daughter and Ben and Ivy's little half-sister
 Jakari Fraser as Liam Burns-Beeby, Holly and Neal's 6-year-old son and Ben and Ivy's little half-brother
 Ponce as the family dog

Production
The project was announced in October 2017, with Lucas Hedges and Julia Roberts set to star. In November, Kathryn Newton was cast as the titular Ben's sister Ivy, and Alexandra Park joined as an addict Ben meets during an Alcoholics Anonymous meeting. Filming began on December 5, with Courtney B. Vance joining the cast as Ben's stepfather. Filming took place in Yonkers, New City, Sloatsburg, Larchmont, Mamaroneck, Garnerville, and Haverstraw, New York.

Release
In July 2018, LD Entertainment, Roadside Attractions and Lionsgate acquired distribution rights to the film, which they released on December 7, 2018. The film had its world premiere at the Toronto International Film Festival on September 8, 2018.

Reception
The website's critics consensus reads, "Refreshingly understated, Ben Is Back subverts family drama stereotypes - and provides a forum for terrific performances from Lucas Hedges and Julia Roberts." At Metacritic, the film has a weighted average score of 66 out of 100 based on 39 reviews, indicating "generally favorable reviews".

Accolades

References

External links
 
 
 

2018 films
American drama films
Black Bear Pictures films
Films about drugs
Films about addiction
Films set in New York (state)
Films shot in New York (state)
Roadside Attractions films
LD Entertainment films
2018 drama films
Films about mother–son relationships
2010s English-language films
2010s American films